The Colombian Fino Hound  is a breed of scent hound from Colombia.

History
It is believed the Colombian Fino Hound descends from scent hounds imported into Colombia, the breed has been known in the country for at least two centuries although there is some evidence that some of the breed's ancestors have been in the country for up to 350 years. The breed is found within rural communities, particularly in the north of the country, and is considered part of peasant culture. The breed is recognised by Colombia's national kennel club, the Asociación Club Canino Colombiano, and in 2015 it was estimated there were as many as 10,000 examples of the breed within Colombia.

Description
The Colombian Fino Hound is a medium-sized, short haired, long eared breed which displays many typical scent hound traits.

The Colombian Fino Hound short haired coat can be found in a broad range colours, the breed standard stating they can be any shade, pattern or combination of red, black, white, brown or brindle; the breed has a long tail. The breed has a very strong sense of smell.

See also
 Dogs portal
 List of dog breeds

References

Scent hounds
Dog breeds originating in Colombia